Resnikoff is a surname of Russian origin. It may refer to:

 Charles Reznikoff (1894–1976), American poet best known for his long work, Testimony
 Florence Resnikoff (1920–2013), American artist and educator in the fields of metals and jewelry
 Howard L. Resnikoff (1937–2018), American mathematician and business executive.
 Irving Resnikoff (1897–1988), Russian-born portrait painter based in New York